The Wukang Mansion or Wukang Building, formerly known as the Normandie Apartments or International Savings Society Apartments, is a protected historic apartment building in the former French Concession area of Shanghai. It was designed by the Hungarian-Slovak architect László Hudec and completed in 1924. The building has been the residence of many celebrities.

Location
The building is located at the southern end of Wukang Road (formerly Route Ferguson), on the corner with Middle Huaihai Road (formerly Avenue Joffre), in Shanghai's Xuhui District. It is in the western part of the former French Concession area of the city. The address of the building is 1836–1858 Middle Huaihai Road.

Architecture

Completed in 1924, the eight-storey building was designed by the renowned Hungarian-Slovak architect László Hudec (1893–1958), who designed many landmarks in Shanghai. It is in the French Renaissance style and is the oldest veranda-style apartment building in Shanghai. There's an urban legend that the name was to commemorate Normandie, a World War I-era battleship. However no such battleship served in WWI in the French Navy. The building looks like a ship from one direction. The unusual wedge-shape of the building is reminiscent of the Flatiron Building in New York City.

There were originally 63 apartments, 30 servants' quarters, and three elevators.

History
Originally built for Western employees of companies based in the foreign concessions, the building was bought by Kung Ling-wei, daughter of the wealthy banker H. H. Kung, in 1942. Kung moved into the building, which also became popular with many celebrities of Shanghai, centre of China's film industry during the Republic of China era. Residents included famous actors and actresses Wu Yin, Wang Renmei, Qin Yi, Zhao Dan, Sun Daolin, Wang Wenjuan, Shangguan Yunzhu, and actor/director Zheng Junli. Sun Daolin lived in the building for 30 years with his wife Wang Wenjuan, until his death in 2007. Soong Ching-ling, the widow of President Sun Yat-sen, lived opposite the building across Huaihai Road. Her home is now open to the public as the Soong Ching-ling Memorial Residence.

The former Normandie Apartments was renamed in 1953 to Wukang Mansion after the street it is on. During the Cultural Revolution (1966–1976), the Red Guards renamed the building Anti-Revisionist Tower, but local residents referred to it as "The Diving Board" because of the dozens of suicides by intellectuals and others who were persecuted as "state enemies".

Wukang Mansion is one of Shanghai's historic buildings under municipal protection. In 2008 it was restored by the government of Xuhui District.

See also
 List of historic buildings in Shanghai
 Normandie Hotel

References

László Hudec buildings
1924 establishments in China
Buildings and structures in Shanghai
Landmarks in Shanghai
Shops in Shanghai
Apartment buildings in China
French Renaissance architecture
Commercial buildings completed in 1924
Flatiron buildings